Triloki Prasad is a Nepalese politician. He is a member of Provincial Assembly of Madhesh Province from CPN (Unified Marxist–Leninist). Prasad, a resident of Kolhabi, was elected via 2017 Nepalese provincial elections from Bara 1(A).

Electoral history

2017 Nepalese provincial elections

References

Living people
1958 births
Madhesi people
21st-century Nepalese politicians
Members of the Provincial Assembly of Madhesh Province
Communist Party of Nepal (Unified Marxist–Leninist) politicians